Yeppoon is a coastal town and locality in the Shire of Livingstone, Queensland, Australia. Yeppoon is renowned for its beaches, tropical climate, and the islands out on the bay. The beaches and shallow coves provide a destination both for tourists and retirees settling down in Central Queensland.

Geography
It is located within the local government area of Shire of Livingstone in Central Queensland. Between 2008 and 2013, it was within the Rockhampton Region).

Road infrastructure
The Rockhampton-Yeppoon Road (as Yeppoon Road) runs along part of the southern boundary.

History
The Capricorn Coast was part of the traditional lands of the Darumbal Aboriginal people. Yeppoon was first settled by the Ross family in 1865 who took up large landholding along the length of the Capricorn Coast.  Fruit crops, cattle, and wool were the major industries of the early town. A short-lived period of sugar cane growing followed from 1883 to 1903, which failed due to unseasonal rains and lack of financial backing. Along with other sugar growing areas of Australia, South Sea Islanders were used as labourers on the sugar plantations, often without their consent (see blackbirding). Pineapples, mangoes, and other tropical fruit became the mainstay of local agriculture in the new century, with cattle grazing and fishing also contributing to the local economy. 

Yeppoon Provisional School opened on 4 May 1885 and became Yeppoon State School on 1 October 1889. Originally in Queen Street, it was relocated in 1957 to Tucker Street.

St Ursula's College, a Catholic day and boarding school for girls, was established on 12 March 1918 by the Presentation Sisters.

St Brendan's College, a Catholic day and boarding school for boys, was established on 8 October 1939 by the Christian Brothers.

Yeppoon Infants State School opened on 24 January 1955, but closed in 1968.

Yeppoon State High School opened on 28 January 1969.

The Bay View Tower motel and restaurant become Yeppoon first high-rise building in 1986.

On 20 February 2015, severe tropical cyclone Marcia crossed the Capricorn Coast near Shoalwater Bay as a category 5 Cyclone. The storm destroyed more than 150 houses in Yeppoon and left more than 13,500 residents without power.

The Yeppoon Public Library was opened in 1990 and went through a major refurbishment in 2017.

Yeppoon is within the local government area of Shire of Livingstone (between 2008 and 2013, it was within the Rockhampton Region following a local government amalgamation that was reversed in 2014).

Heritage listings
Yeppoon has a number of heritage-listed sites, including:
 Yeppoon railway station, James Street
 Yeppoon War Memorial, Normanby Street

 former Yeppoon State School building, 29 Queen Street
 current Yeppoon State School, Tucker Street

Governance

In 1879, the Gogango Division was established as one of 74 divisions in Queensland under the Divisional Boards Act 1879. The Gogango Divisional Board's scope of authority comprised a large area north and east of Rockhampton.  While the Division was administered in Rockhampton, a locally appointed body, the Yeppoon Progress Association, met once a month to look after the minor requirements of the town.

The discovery of gold brought a huge influx of people to the region, and the various Boards broke up into smaller administrative bodies to better service the growing population.  In 1903, the Gogango Divisional Board was renamed Shire of Livingstone.

The boundaries of the new shire remained largely unchanged until 1984, when outlying districts including the suburbs of Nerimbera and Parkhurst were ceded to Livingstone's larger neighbour, City of Rockhampton.  Continued growth in both Local Government Authorities became a contentious subject from then on, which caused much political tension, until finally in 2007, local conflicts came to a head with the tabling before the Parliament of Queensland of the proposed Local Government (Reform Implementation) Act 2007.

The Act passed, and on 15 March 2008, Livingstone Shire merged with Fitzroy Shire, Mount Morgan Shire, and Rockhampton City to form the new local government area, Rockhampton Region. This forced amalgamation caused political tension. Following a majority vote by residents to restore the Shire of Livingstone, on 1 January 2014, the Shire of Livingstone was re-established with its 2008 boundaries with its seat at Yeppoon.

Education 
Yeppoon State School is a government primary (Early Childhood-6) school for boys and girls in Tucker Street. In 2015, the school had an enrolment of 320 students with 30 teachers (24 full-time equivalent) and 23 non-teaching staff (14 full-time equivalent). In 2018, the school had an enrolment of 320 students with 28 teachers (24 full-time equivalent) and 16 non-teaching staff (12 full-time equivalent). It includes a special education program.

Yeppoon State High School is a government secondary (7-12) school for boys and girls at Rawlings Street. In 2015, the school had an enrolment of 1,006 students with 84 teachers (81 full-time equivalent) and 44 non-teaching staff (32 full-time equivalent). In 2018, the school had an enrolment of 1,033 students with 88 teachers (86 full-time equivalent) and 41 non-teaching staff (31 full-time equivalent).

St Ursula's College is a Catholic secondary (7-12) school for girls at Queen Street. In 2018, the school had an enrolment of 393 students with 36 teachers (32 full-time equivalent) and 30 non-teaching staff (18 full-time equivalent).

St Brendan's College is a Catholic secondary (7-12) school for boys at 139 Adelaide Park Road. In 2018, the school had an enrolment of 614 students with 53 teachers (52 full-time equivalent) and 44 non-teaching staff (34 full-time equivalent).

Amenities 
The Livingstone Shire Council operates the Yeppoon Library on 84 John Street, Yeppoon.

The Yeppoon branch of the Queensland Country Women's Association meets at the RSL Hall at 5 Normanby Street.

The Livingstone Shire council has also installed a waterpark on the foreshore called the Keppel Kraken, which features interactive water features and play areas for children. The shire also operates The Yeppoon Lagoon, a  resort style lagoon pool located in the old council building site, right on the water front. The lagoon includes a shallow children's play area, and informal lap pool and an infinity edge with views over the Keppel islands.

Yeppoon Wesleyan Methodist Church is at 1 Fred Lawn Drive. It is part of the Wesleyan Methodist Church.

Shopping 
Yeppoon has a number of shopping centres.
Yeppoon Central
Keppel Bay Plaza
Yeppoon CBD
Tanby Road District

Healthcare 
 Capricorn Coast Hospital

Media
Although mainly served by media from nearby Rockhampton, there is a small selection of local media based on the Capricorn Coast.

Until 2020, Yeppoon had its own weekly newspaper called The Capricorn Coast Mirror, which was started by locals John and Suzy Watson in 1983. The Capricorn Coast Mirror was an offshoot to the region's daily newspaper The Morning Bulletin, focusing on news and issues directly relevant to communities throughout Livingstone Shire and the Capricorn Coast.  However, in 2020, The Mirror was one of 36 small newspapers in Australia which were closed entirely by News Corp Australia.

An independent news magazine called The Spectator is published locally on the Capricorn Coast and issued fortnightly. It was also established by Suzy and John Watson as an independent alternative for news in the Livingstone Shire.

Keppel FM (formerly 4NAG) is Yeppoon's local community radio station which has locally based on-air presenters hosting a variety of special interest programming each day from a studio in Yeppoon.  The station was founded in 1998 and broadcasts to the Livingstone Shire on 91.3 FM.

Sport
Yeppoon is home to prominent Rugby league breeding ground St. Brendan's College.   Professional players Paul Bowman, Casey Conway, Tom Hewitt, PJ Marsh, Shane Marteene, Julian O'Neill, Matthew Scott, Jake Granville, Corey Oates, Dave Taylor, Ben Hunt and Harry Grant are all St. Brendan's alumni.

Climate 
Yeppoon experiences a humid subtropical climate (Köppen: Cfa, Trewartha: Cfal), with long, hot, wet summers and short, mild, dry winters. Due to its location in the southern tropics, the Capricorn Coast with lower humidity than Far North Queensland, resulting in less oppressive summer conditions.

Gallery

See also

 Cooee Bay
 Taranganba
 Ross Creek
 Lammermoor
 Emu Park

References

External links

 University of Queensland: Queensland Places: Yeppoon
 Capricorn Coast History & Geography
 Livingstone Shire

 
Coastal towns in Queensland
Shire of Livingstone
Capricorn Coast
Localities in Queensland